Lumbini Gardens is a public park on the banks of the Nagawara Lake in Bangalore, Karnataka. It contains an eco-friendly boating park and a 12,500 square foot artificial beach and children's pool.

References

Tourist attractions in Bangalore
Gardens in India
Parks in Bangalore